Highbanks may refer to

Highbanks, Indiana
Highbanks Metro Park
Highbanks Metropolitan Park Mounds I and II
Highbank Park Works